Lapinjärvi may refer to:

Lapinjärvi (municipality), a municipality in Finland.
Lapinjärvi (lake), a lake in the above municipality.
Lapinjärvi (village), the largest village and administrative center of Lapinjärvi municipality

See also
Lapinjärvi Educational Center, training civilian service personnel